Bayhawks may refer to:
Erie BayHawks (disambiguation), several basketball teams in Erie, Pennsylvania
Chesapeake Bayhawks, a Major League Lacrosse team in Annapolis, Maryland
Bayhawk, the mascot of St. Dominic High School (Oyster Bay, New York)
Bayhawks, the mascot of Bellingham High School (Bellingham, Washington)

See also
Osprey